Takht-e Khvajeh may refer to:
 Takht-e Khvajeh-ye Bala
 Takht-e Khvajeh-ye Pain